The 1982 Currie Cup was the 44th edition of the Currie Cup, the premier annual domestic rugby union competition in South Africa.

See also

 Currie Cup

References

1982
1982 in South African rugby union
1982 rugby union tournaments for clubs